Serbia competed at the 2020 Summer Olympics in Tokyo. Originally scheduled to take place from 24 July to 9 August 2020, the Games were postponed to 23 July to 8 August 2021, due to the COVID-19 pandemic. It was the nation's fifth appearance at the Summer Olympics as an independent nation.

Medalists

Competitors
The following is the list of number of competitors participating in the Games:

Athletics

Serbian athletes further achieved the entry standards, either by qualifying time or by world ranking, in the following track and field events (up to a maximum of 3 athletes in each event):

Field events

Basketball

Indoor
Summary

Women's tournament

Serbia women's basketball team qualified for the Olympics as one of two highest-ranked eligible squads from group A at the Belgrade meet of the 2020 FIBA Women's Olympic Qualifying Tournament.

Team roster

Group play

Quarterfinal

Semifinal

Bronze medal game

3x3 basketball
Summary

Men's tournament

Serbia men's national 3x3 team qualified directly for the Olympics by securing an outright berth, as one of the three highest-ranked squads, in the men's category of the FIBA rankings.

Team roster
Head coach: Goran Vojkić
Dušan Domović Bulut
Dejan Majstorović
Aleksandar Ratkov
Mihailo Vasić

Group play

Semifinal

Bronze medal match

Boxing

Serbia entered one boxer into the Olympic tournament for the first time at the Games. Nina Radovanović topped the list of boxers vying for qualification from Europe in the women's flyweight category based on the IOC's Boxing Task Force Rankings.

Canoeing

Sprint
Serbian canoeists qualified three boats in each of the following distances for the Games through the 2019 ICF Canoe Sprint World Championships in Szeged, Hungary.

Qualification Legend: FA = Qualify to final (medal); FB = Qualify to final B (non-medal); FC = Qualify to final C (non-medal)

Judo
 
Serbia qualified five judoka (two men and three women) for each of the following weight classes at the Games. 2017 world champion Nemanja Majdov (men's middleweight, 90 kg), Rio 2016 Olympian Aleksandar Kukolj (men's half-heavyweight, 100 kg), Milica Nikolić (women's extra-lightweight, 48 kg), and Marica Perišić (women's lightweight, 57 kg) were selected among the top 18 judoka of their respective weight classes based on the IJF World Ranking List of June 28, 2021, while Anja Obradović (women's haf-middleweight, 63 kg) accepted a continental berth from Europe as the nation's top-ranked judoka outside of direct qualifying position.

Karate
 
Serbia entered one karateka into the inaugural Olympic tournament. 2018 world champion Jovana Preković qualified directly for the women's kumite 61-kg category by finishing among the top four karateka at the end of the combined WKF Olympic Rankings.

Rowing

Serbia qualified one boat in the men's pair for the Games by topping the B-final and securing seventh out of eleven berths available at the 2019 FISA World Championships in Ottensheim, Austria. Meanwhile, the women's single sculls rower added one boat for the Serbian roster with a bronze-medal finish in the A-final at the 2021 European Continental Qualification Regatta in Varese, Italy.

Qualification Legend: FA=Final A (medal); FB=Final B (non-medal); FC=Final C (non-medal); FD=Final D (non-medal); FE=Final E (non-medal); FF=Final F (non-medal); SA/B=Semifinals A/B; SC/D=Semifinals C/D; SE/F=Semifinals E/F; QF=Quarterfinals; R=Repechage

Shooting

Serbian shooters achieved quota places for the following events by virtue of their best finishes at the 2018 ISSF World Championships, the 2019 ISSF World Cup series, European Championships or Games, and European Qualifying Tournament, as long as they obtained a minimum qualifying score (MQS) by June 6, 2021.

Men

Women

Mixed

Swimming

Serbian swimmers further achieved qualifying standards in the following events (up to a maximum of 2 swimmers in each event at the Olympic Qualifying Time (OQT), and potentially 1 at the Olympic Selection Time (OST)):

Table tennis

Serbia entered three athletes into the table tennis competition at the Games. The men's team secured a berth by advancing to the quarterfinal round of the 2020 World Olympic Qualification Event in Gondomar, Portugal, permitting a maximum of two starters to compete in the men's singles tournament.

Taekwondo

Serbia entered two athletes into the taekwondo competition at the Games. Rio 2016 silver medalist Tijana Bogdanović (women's 49 kg) and London 2012 champion Milica Mandić (women's +67 kg) qualified directly for their respective weight classes by finishing among the top five taekwondo practitioners at the end of the WT Olympic Rankings.

Tennis
 
Serbia entered five tennis players into the Olympic tournament. Beijing 2008 bronze medalist and world No. 1 Novak Djokovic and Miomir Kecmanović (world no. 47) qualified directly as one of the top 56 eligible players in the ATP World Rankings, while Nina Stojanović (world no. 85) and Ivana Jorović (world no. 90) did so for the women's singles based on their WTA World Rankings of June 13, 2021.

Volleyball

Indoor
Summary

Women's tournament

Serbia women's volleyball team qualified for the Olympics by securing an outright berth as the highest-ranked nation for pool A at the Intercontinental Olympic Qualification Tournament in Wrocław, Poland.

Team roster

Group play

Quarterfinal

Semifinal

Bronze medal match

Water polo

Summary

Men's tournament

Serbian men's water polo team qualified for the Olympics by winning the gold medal and securing an outright berth at the 2019 FINA World League Super Final in Belgrade.

Team roster

Group play

Quarterfinal

Semifinal

Gold medal game

Wrestling

Serbia qualified four wrestlers for each of the following classes into the Olympic competition. Three of them finished among the top six to book Olympic spots in the men's freestyle (57 kg) and the men's Greco-Roman (67 and 97 kg) at the 2019 World Championships, while an additional license was awarded to the Serbian wrestler, who progressed to the top two finals of the men's Greco-Roman 87 kg at the 2021 World Qualification Tournament in Sofia, Bulgaria.

Freestyle

Greco-Roman

References

External links 
 Olympic Committee of Serbia

Nations at the 2020 Summer Olympics
2020
2021 in Serbian sport